Hopea inexpectata is a species of plant in the family Dipterocarpaceae. It is endemic to Papua New Guinea.

References

inexpectata
Endemic flora of Papua New Guinea
Trees of Papua New Guinea
Critically endangered flora of Oceania
Taxonomy articles created by Polbot